Eleanor Daley may refer to:

Eleanor Daley (1907–2003),  wife of former mayor of Chicago Richard J. Daley and mother of former mayor Richard M. Daley
Eleanor Daley (composer) (born 1955) Canadian composer, music arranger, organist and accompanist
 Eleanor Daly (Fair City character), fictional character in the Irish television soap opera Fair City